Ronald Courtney Hemi (15 May 1933 – 13 September 2000) was a New Zealand rugby union footballer. He played 46 matches for the All Blacks including 16 tests from 1953 to 1959. He also played first-class cricket for  Auckland.

See also
 List of Auckland representative cricketers

References

External links
 

1933 births
2000 deaths
New Zealand international rugby union players
Auckland cricketers
New Zealand cricketers
New Zealand rugby union players
Rugby union players from Whangārei
Cricketers from Whangārei
Rugby union hookers